The second cabinet of Anfinn Kallsberg was the government of the Faroe Islands from  6 June 2002 until 3 February 2004, with Anfinn Kallsberg from People's Party (Fólkaflokkurin) as Prime Minister. It was a coalition between People's Party (Fólkaflokkurin), Republic (Tjóðveldi), Centre Party (Miðflokkurin) and the Self-Government Party (Sjálvstýrisflokkurin).

References 

Cabinets of the Faroe Islands
2002 in the Faroe Islands
2003 in the Faroe Islands
2004 in the Faroe Islands